The Layton House is a historic home located at Laytonsville, Montgomery County, Maryland, United States. It was built in 1793 and is a two-story brick Federal-style house with a three-bay Flemish bond main (north) facade and a gable roof.

The Layton House was listed on the National Register of Historic Places on September 25, 

1975.

References

External links
, including photo in 2004, at Maryland Historical Trust website

Houses on the National Register of Historic Places in Maryland
Houses completed in 1835
Houses in Montgomery County, Maryland
Federal architecture in Maryland
National Register of Historic Places in Montgomery County, Maryland